H. S. Pledge & Sons Ltd was a business engaged in the milling industry. The firm was started by Henry Sturgess Pledge who learnt his trade at the Black Mill at Barham near Canterbury in Kent. The company operated at Ashford until 1984 when its remaining mill was destroyed by fire.

History
The firm was started in 1890 by Henry Sturgess Pledge. He was apprenticed at the Black Mill, Barham c.1850. Upon leaving Barham some time before 1882, Pledge ran the Wind, Steam and Water Mills at Kennington until 1892. Pledge ran the company with his sons Lawrence John Pledge and Walter Ebeneser Pledge. H S Pledge & Sons Ltd were millers and corn merchants owning two mills in Ashford; Victoria Mills and East Hill Mill.

East Hill Mill – 
East Hill Mill was a watermill and steam mill. It is still standing at the bottom of East Hill Road, Ashford. As of 2010, it is a nightclub owned by Luminar Leisure called Liquid and Envy.

On the mill it states the date when it was built "Flour Mill 1901". In the 1901 census of West Ashford the Miller was Pledge's son Lawrence, he lived at the mill with his wife Ellen and six children.

Victoria Mills – 
The Victoria Mills was a steam mill. It was built in 1890. The date was prominently displayed on the mill building. In the 1901 Census of West Ashford the Miller was Pledge's son Walter, he lived at the Mill with his wife Emma.  Victoria Mills were working until September 1984, when the building was gutted by fire. The mill was then demolished due to it being left in an unsafe condition. The company had been taken over by the Garnham Family. In 2014 the company was dissolved.

References

Sources
 

Companies based in Kent
Food and drink companies established in 1890
Food and drink companies disestablished in 2014
History of Kent
Ashford, Kent
1890 establishments in England
2014 disestablishments in England
British companies established in 1890
British companies disestablished in 2014